Rragami is a surname of Albanian origin. Notable people with the surname include:

Ferid Rragami (born 1957), Albanian footballer
Ramazan Rragami (1944–2022), Albanian footballer and coach

Surnames of Albanian origin